Jackson Tower, formerly The Oregon Journal Building is a 12-story,  glazed terra-cotta historic office building in downtown Portland, Oregon. Located on the corner of Broadway and Yamhill Streets, it enjoys a prominent location adjacent to Pioneer Courthouse Square.

History
The building was constructed to house the operations of the now-defunct Oregon Journal. The Journal occupied the structure from its completion in 1912 until July 4, 1948, when the newspaper moved to the larger quarters of the former Portland Public Market building on the Portland waterfront. In 1951, the structure was renamed Jackson Tower to honor the newspaper's founder, Charles Samuel Jackson. The impressive clock tower results from the common practice, at that time, of newspapers' integrating such structures into their headquarters. Additionally, 1,800 light bulbs illuminate the tower after dark. There were originally 2,400.

The Jackson Tower was renovated in 1972, and placed on the National Register of Historic Places (as the Journal Building) in 1996. The base of the building measures .  The north portion of the ground floor has housed Margulis Jewelers for several decades.

Each of the 1,800 light bulbs screw directly into the facade.  In addition to the tower's illumination, at one time the clocks used to chime every 15 minutes, but the bells were moved to the Journal's new building on the waterfront in June 1948.  Each clockface is 12.5 feet in diameter. The clock itself does not currently function as of summer 2011.

See also
Architecture in Portland, Oregon

References

External links
 

1912 establishments in Oregon
Skyscraper office buildings in Portland, Oregon
Clock towers in Oregon
National Register of Historic Places in Portland, Oregon
Office buildings completed in 1912
Reid & Reid buildings
Terracotta
Newspaper headquarters in the United States
Southwest Portland, Oregon
Portland Historic Landmarks